Dianella brevipedunculata is a species of flax lily native to Eastern Australia. It is known as the blue flax lily.

The species grows up to half a meter in height, with leaves up to 1 meter in length. Roots are fibrous, and the flowers are purplish-blue. Fruit are round and blue. The species is hardy and perennial.

Dianella brevipedunculata is common in cultivation as an ornamental plant. The berries are reported to be mildly toxic.

References

brevipedunculata